
Parczew County is a unit of territorial administration and local government (powiat) in Lublin Voivodeship, eastern Poland. It was established on January 1, 1999, as a result of the Polish local government reforms passed in 1998.

As of 2006, its total population is 34,809, including 10,602 in Parczew and a rural population of 24,207.

Neighbouring counties
Parczew County is bordered by Biała Podlaska County to the north, Włodawa County to the east, Łęczna County to the south, Lubartów County to the south-west and Radzyń Podlaski County to the north-west.

Administrative division
The county is subdivided into seven gminas (one urban-rural and six rural). These are listed in the following table, in descending order of population.

References

 
Parczew